Frances is an unincorporated community in Johnson County, Indiana, in the United States.

According to one source, Frances was the name of wife of a railroad man.

References

Unincorporated communities in Johnson County, Indiana
Unincorporated communities in Indiana